Phạm Trùm Tỉnh (born 2 May 1995) is a Vietnamese footballer who plays as a midfielder for the V.League 1 club

References

1995 births
Living people
Vietnamese footballers
Association football midfielders
V.League 1 players
People from Phú Yên province